The No Mercy Man (also known as Bad Man, Trained to Kill, and Trained to Kill USA) is a 1973 action film with elements of a modern-day Western starring Steve Sandor, Rockne Tarkington, Sid Haig, Ron Thompson, Mike Lane, and Richard X. Slattery.  The film was co-written (with Michael Nolin) and directed by Daniel Vance in his first and last feature film. The film was shot in Todd-AO by Dean Cundey in his first feature film with Buddy Joe Hooker arranging the stunt work and acting as second unit director. Master Jerry Druckerman acted as the film's martial arts technical advisor.

Film director Quentin Tarantino programmed The No Mercy Man as part of a March 2011 revenge film triple feature at the New Beverly Cinema, which Tarantino took over in March 2007.

Plot
Prophet and his friends are carnies and itinerant criminals in Arizona.  After robbing a liquor store Prophet and a friend evade the local Sheriff and stop at the ranch of Mark Hand, a decorated war veteran.  Feeling suspicious, Mark tells Prophet he can help himself to water at a pump behind the house but covers him with a rifle.  Prophet's friend overpowers Mark from behind, ties him up and beats him prior to robbing Mark's house.  Attracted by the mass amount of firearms in Mark's cabinet, they are distracted by Mark's daughter Mary who Prophet's friend attempts to rape. Mary wounds him with a knife and escapes in the desert coming across the car returning home driven by Mrs Hand and Mary's brother Olie who has returned from the Vietnam War with decorations and mental illnesses.  Prophet and his friend make their escape with Mark puzzled that Olie doesn't want to hunt the criminals, preferring to let the sheriff handle the matter.

Though glad to be home, Olie grows more sullen and uncommunicative.  Two of Olie's war buddies visit the Hand ranch and reveal that Olie was their legendary commander of a 6-man long-range reconnaissance patrol of United States Army Rangers, with one patrol taking them to Haiphong where they escaped in a Russian ship. Despite the supporting presence of his comrades in arms and loving family Olie grows more withdrawn and prone to flashbacks to the war where he nearly kills one of his friends when the two engage in good-natured sparring.

Meanwhile, Prophet and his friends plan more criminal acts where they steal a large recreational vehicle that they plan to sell across the border in Mexico, but the gang murders the family who own it.  Some members of Prophet's gang stop off at a gas station where they abuse the attendant until they are beaten up by Olie and his army buddies.  Enraged, the Prophet plans revenge and a big criminal score where they will attack the Hand ranch, steal Hand's mass arsenal, recruit a motorcycle gang led by Pillbox to distract the sheriff, and rob the town's bank where they will split the proceeds with Pillbox and make their escape to Mexico that lies across open rangeland adjoining the Hand ranch.  Olie bids his army buddies farewell then further descends into a self-pitying alcoholic stupor.

Cast
 Steve Sandor as Olie Hand 
 Rockne Tarkington as Prophet 
 Richard X. Slattery as Mark Hand 
 Heidi Vaughn as Mary Hand 
 Mike Lane as Jack "Big Jack" 
 Sid Haig as "Pillbox"
 Ron Thompson as John Dunn 
 David Booth as "Beetle" 
 Daniel Oaks as Corporal Lyle Talbot 
 Tom Scott as Parrish 
 Michael Prichard as Bruce Bennett 
 Peg Stewart as Mrs. Hand 
 Richard Collier as Joshua White 
 Darlene Feasel as Dora Adams 
 Russell Morrell as Sheriff Harris

Songs

The No Mercy Man
Written by Lois and Don Vincent
Performed by Al Gambino & Glory

Sunshine Lady 
Written and Performed by Chris Christian

Fighting The Forgotten Feeling
Written and Performed by Chris Christian

Ballad of Olie Hand
Written and Performed by Chris Christian

Lonely Lonely Times
Written by Lois and Don Vincent
Performed by Al Gambino & Glory

Reach Out
Written by Lois and Don Vincent
Performed by Al Gambino & Glory

See also
 List of American films of 1973

References

External links

1973 films
1970s action thriller films
American action thriller films
American films about revenge
Films set in Arizona
Vietnam War films
Golan-Globus films
1973 directorial debut films
American vigilante films
American exploitation films
1970s English-language films
1970s American films